"Habit" is a single by Japanese pop band Sekai no Owari. The song was a hit in Japan, winning the Grand Prix at the 64th Japan Record Awards. The song was released digitally on April 28, 2022, before a full physical single was released on June 22.

Reception 
The song was initially released as the theme song for a live-action film based on the manga series xxxHOLiC. The song proved to be very popular, topping the Billboard Japan Hot 100 Chart. The song peaked at 4th on the Oricon Charts.

Music video 
Habit's music video was critically praised, winning the MTV Japan award for Video of the Year, along with the award for Best Dance Video. It features the band members acting as staff members in a school, with professional dancers as students. The video was directed by Dai Ikeda.

Track listing

Personnel 
Credits adapted from Youtube Music

 Sekai No Owari - producer (all tracks), associated performer (all tracks), recording arranger (all tracks)
 Fukase - associated performer (all tracks), vocals (all tracks), author (tracks 1-2)
 Saori - associated performer (tracks 1-2), piano (tracks 1-2), composer (track 3), lyricist (track 3)
 Nakajin - associated performer (all tracks), guitar (tracks 1-2), bass (tracks 1-2), programming (tracks 1-2), composer (tracks 1-2), background vocalist (tracks 2-3)
 Mike Marrington - associated performer (track 1), drums (track 1)
 Kazuya Maeda - studio personnel (tracks 1-2), recording engineer (tracks 1-2), mixer (tracks 1-2), vocal engineer, vocal editing (track 3)
 Chris Gehringer - studio personnel (all tracks), mastering engineer (all tracks)
 Yaffle - associated performer (track 3), recording arranger (track 3), producer (track 3), programmer (track 3), studio personnel (track 3), editor (track 3)
 D.O.I. - studio personnel (track 3), mixer (track 3)

Charts

References

External links 

 

2022 singles
2022 songs
Sekai no Owari songs
Japanese film songs
Billboard Japan Hot 100 number-one singles
Virgin Records singles
Universal Music Japan singles